Shwan Jalal (born 14 August 1983) is a Kurdish-British professional football coach and former goalkeeper. He is currently serving as the goalkeeping coach at Newcastle United, a position he has held since 21 October 2022. Jalal was capped five times for the England C team and was later called up for the Iraq national team.

Club career
Jalal, born to Kurdish parents in Baghdad, Iraq, grew up in Hastings, East Sussex, England, while attending William Parker School. He began his football career at Gillingham's youth system in 1998, before joining the youth system at Hastings Town in 1999, where he broke into the first team in 2000. At Hastings, he featured for the first team as a teenager, gaining attention from Football League clubs such as Tottenham Hotspur, whom he signed for in August 2001, before joining Woking in May 2004. He went on trial at Oldham Athletic in May 2005, and also had a trial at Leeds United in September 2006. Following his trial at Leeds, he joined Sheffield Wednesday on a month's loan in November.

He moved to Peterborough United in League Two for an undisclosed fee on 9 January 2007. He was placed on the club's transfer list at his own request in December, which was followed by a move to Morecambe on loan until the end of the 2007–08 season.

He joined AFC Bournemouth on a month's loan on 1 August 2008 after having a trial at the club. Bournemouth then made this move permanent on 29 August. He signed a new two-year contract with Bournemouth in March 2010. On 12 September 2013, Jalal joined Oxford United on a one-month emergency loan deal, but returned on 2 October 2013 - 1 game short of his initial loan - due to Ryan Allsop's suspension after receiving a red card at Leeds United. On 7 February 2014, Jalal joined Leyton Orient on a one-month loan deal.

On 5 June 2014, Bury announced that they had signed Jalal on a two-year contract after a successful trial at the club. He subsequently played for Northampton and Macclesfield Town.

In August 2016, Jalal joined National League side Wrexham. Jalal made his debut on 16 August 2016, replacing Chris Dunn in the starting line-up in a 1–0 victory over Solihull Moors and keeping a clean sheet. At the end of the 2016–17 season, he left the club. He subsequently re-joined Macclesfield Town on a one-year deal, winning promotion from the National League as champions, before his surprise release at the end of the season.

In May 2018, Jalal joined National League newcomers Chesterfield , signing a two-year contract.

International career
Jalal made his debut for the England National Game XI in a 3–0 victory over against the Netherlands on 16 February 2005. Jalal was one of seven European based players called up by Iraq coach Wolfgang Sidka in a 34-man squad on 26 May 2011. However, he had to apologise for his absence due to an injury.

On 3 June 2015, Jalal played the first half of an unofficial friendly for the Iraq national team against Zakho in the opening game of the Zakho International Stadium.

Coaching career
Upon retiring from playing in 2020, he took up roles as a Goalkeeper Coach, firstly with the Rochdale Academy and then Stockport County.  He now works with Newcastle United.

Honours
AFC Bournemouth
League 2 Promotion: 2009–2010

AFC Bournemouth
League 1 Promotion: 2012–2013

Macclesfield Town
National League: 2017–18

Individual
National League Team of the Year: 2017–18

References

External links

1983 births
Living people
Sportspeople from Baghdad
Iraqi expatriate footballers
Iraqi footballers
English footballers
England semi-pro international footballers
Association football goalkeepers
Gillingham F.C. players
Hastings United F.C. players
Tottenham Hotspur F.C. players
Woking F.C. players
Sheffield Wednesday F.C. players
Peterborough United F.C. players
Morecambe F.C. players
AFC Bournemouth players
Oxford United F.C. players
Leyton Orient F.C. players
Bury F.C. players
Northampton Town F.C. players
Macclesfield Town F.C. players
Wrexham A.F.C. players
Chesterfield F.C. players
English Football League players
National League (English football) players
Iraqi emigrants to the United Kingdom
English people of Iraqi descent
British people of Kurdish descent
British Asian footballers
Kurdish sportspeople
Rochdale A.F.C. non-playing staff
Stockport County F.C. non-playing staff
Newcastle United F.C. non-playing staff